Jamet is a surname. Notable people with the surname include:

Denis Jamet (died 1625), French priest
France Jamet, French politician
Pierre Jamet (1893–1991), French harpist and pedagogue
Marie-Claire Jamet (born 1933), harpist, daughter of Pierre Jamet
Victor Jamet (1853–1919), French mathematician